Kettle's Yard is an art gallery and house in Cambridge, England. The director of the art gallery is Andrew Nairne. Both the house and gallery reopened in February 2018 after an expansion of the facilities.

History and overview 

Kettle's Yard House and Gallery lies on the west side of Castle Street, between Northampton Street and St Peter's Church.

It was originally the Cambridge home of Jim Ede and his wife Helen. Moving to Cambridge in 1956, they converted four small cottages with the help of Winton Aldridge into one idiosyncratic house and a place to display Ede's collection of early 20th-century art. Ede maintained an 'open house' each afternoon, giving any visitors, particularly students, a personal tour of his collection.

In 1966, Ede gave the house and collection to the University of Cambridge, but continued living there before he and his wife moved to Edinburgh in 1973. The house is preserved as the Edes left it, making a very informal space to enjoy the permanent collection and live music. In 1970, the house was extended, adding an exhibition gallery in a contrasting modernist style by Leslie Martin.

The house and gallery temporarily closed in June 2015 during a major building project to create a four-floor education wing, improved exhibition galleries, a new entrance area and a café. A series of gentle additions by Jamie Fobert Architects offers greatly improved support services for visitors, including a new courtyard and welcome area and a new shop. The project cost £11,000,000 including £2,320,000 from the Heritage Lottery Fund and £3,700,000 from Arts Council England. The interior of the house has been left untouched.

During the closure, there were displays of the collection at the Fitzwilliam Museum in Cambridge and the Jerwood Gallery in Hastings.

Kettle's Yard is part of the University of Cambridge Museums consortium.

Permanent collection 

The permanent collection is composed of paintings, sculptures and objects collected by Ede. It is largely based on associations and friendships formed when Ede was a curator at Tate Gallery, and as such it is biased towards works from the British avant-garde of the first half of the 20th century.

Ian Hamilton Finlay described Ede's "fusion of art and found objects" on an inscribed pebble as "the Louvre of the pebble".

Notable artists represented in the collection are:
Constantin Brâncuși
William Congdon
Helen Frankenthaler
Henri Gaudier-Brzeska
Ian Hamilton Finlay
Barbara Hepworth
David Jones
Joan Miró
Henry Moore
Ben Nicholson
David Peace 
Winifred Nicholson
Alfred Wallis
Christopher Wood

See also
 Primavera Gallery on King's Parade, has put on several exhibitions at Kettle's Yard
 Wysing Arts Centre, a research and development centre for the arts, west of Cambridge in Bourn

References

External links

Kettle's Yard Gallery website
Kettle's Yard House
Kettle's Yard Collection
Video conversation between Roger Wilson and Paul Coldwell to accompany the exhibition 'Paul Coldwell: I called while you were out' 2008/9

Art museums established in 1966
Art museums and galleries in Cambridgeshire
Museums in Cambridge
Museums of the University of Cambridge
Non-School institutions of the University of Cambridge
Country houses in Cambridgeshire
1966 establishments in England